Goudarz Sadeghi-Hashjin (born July 1, 1963) was the President of University of Mohaghegh Ardabili between 2014 and 2018. He also previously served as president of Urmia University from 2001 till 2005.

Early life
He born on July 1st, 1963 in Hashjin, Khalkhal in north west of Iran. He did his studies in Ardabil up to highschool. In 1989 he was graduated with a professional doctorate in Veterinary medicine from Urmia University. He pursued his education in Pharmacology in Utrecht University in Utrecht, Netherlands where he defended his PhD in 1996. Then, he was employed in Urmia University as an assistant professor and moved to the University of Tehran as an associate professor in 2005. At present, he is a full professor of pharmacology and head of the Department of Comparative Biosciences in the University of Tehran.

References

Academic staff of the University of Mohaghegh Ardabili
1963 births
Living people
Presidents of Urmia University
People from Khalkhal, Iran